Calm Down Juanita is the eponymous first album by psychedelic rock group Calm Down Juanita, released in 1998 through Echo Records.  The album was recorded entirely at the Fremont House in Seattle, Washington on 4-track cassette.  Ty Willman played keyboard and guitar and sang vocals, while Kevin Guess played drums, keyboard, and loops.

This release features Sweet Water bassist Cole Peterson, who wrote one song on the album, Girlfriend, on which Willman's fellow Green Apple Quick Step member, Mari Anne Braeden, plays bass.  Leigh Stone did vocals on Aerospace Runway.  Lobotomy was co-written by  X bassist John Doe and Tyler Willman and featured Doe on vocals and bass.  Guess both wrote and sang Touchin' Myself, which features an unusual lineup, with drummer Josh Freese on bass guitar, guitarist Stone Gossard on drums, and Riff Raff on vinyl and samples.

Monsters, featuring model Camellia Clouse on vocals and Critters Buggin saxophonist Skerik on sax, was mixed by Martin Feveyear and the entire album was mastered by Feveyear at Jupiter Studios.  The rest of the album was mixed by Ty Willman and Steve Wilmans, the engineer and catalyst for the project, at the Stepping Stone Studios, with Daniel Mendez assisting.  The cover design and layout for the Calm Down Juanita CD jacket was done by Geoff Cooper, using a front cover photo taken by Klaus Polkowski and one by Bill Zango inside.  It was produced by Ty Willman and Steve Wilmans and released in 1998 on Willman's label, Echo Records, to which all its songs were copyrighted.

Track listing
All songs by Calm Down Juanita

Personnel

Calm Down Players
Ty Willman
Kevin Guess
R. Cole Peterson, III Esq
Steve Wilmans

Additional Players
Mari Anne Braeden
Camellia Clouse
John Doe
Josh Freese
Leigh Stone
Riff Raff
Skerik
Stone Gossard

Production personnel
Steve Wilmans
Ty Willman
Daniel Mendez
Martin Feveyear

References

1998 albums
Calm Down Juanita albums